is a railway line in Nagasaki Prefecture, Japan, operated by the Kyushu Railway Company (JR Kyushu). It connects Haiki Station in Sasebo to Isahaya Station in Isahaya. From 1898 the line was part of the Nagasaki Main Line until the Hizen Yamaguchi - Isahaya line opened in 1934.

History
The Kyushu Railway Co. opened the entire line in 1898 as part of the original Nagasaki Main Line. The company was nationalised in 1907.

With the opening of the Hizen Yamaguchi - Isahaya section of the Nagasaki Main Line in 1934, the line was renamed the Omura Line.

In 1992 the Haiki - Huis Ten Bosch section was electrified at 20 kV AC.

Stations
S: Trains stop
|: Non-stop

References
This article incorporates material from the corresponding article in the Japanese Wikipedia

 
Lines of Kyushu Railway Company
1067 mm gauge railways in Japan
Railway lines opened in 1898